L-Orizzont (lit. "The Horizon") is a national daily newspaper in Malta published by Union Print Co., the media arm of the General Workers' Union. The newspaper was founded in 1962 by Anton Cassar, who also served as the paper's first editor.

References

External links
 

Newspapers published in Malta
Publications established in 1962
Maltese-language newspapers
1962 establishments in Malta